Shui Jin Gui is a Wuyi oolong tea from Mount Wuyi, Fujian, China. Its name literally means 'golden water turtle'. The tea produces a bright green color when steeped and is much greener than most other Wuyi oolong teas. It is one of the Si Da Ming Cong, the four famous teas of Wuyi.

References

Wuyi tea
Oolong tea
Chinese teas
Chinese tea grown in Fujian
Cultivars of tea grown in China